Kennon Road, also known as the Rosario–Baguio Road, is a two lane  roadway in Benguet province in the Philippines connecting the mountain city of Baguio in Benguet to the lowland town of Rosario in La Union province. The project begun in 1903 and opened for travel on January 29, 1905. Originally called Benguet Road, it was later renamed in honor of its builder, Col. Lyman Walter Vere Kennon of the U.S. Army Corps of Engineers. It is the second oldest road that leads to Baguio, after Quirino Highway, and the shortest route to Baguio for travelers from Manila and provinces in central and southern Luzon.

The entire road forms part of National Route 54 (N54) of the Philippine highway network.

Route description

Coming from the lowlands, Kennon Road is one of the four major access roads that lead to the highland city of Baguio. The upward climb reveals a picturesque view of the mountains, lush vegetation, and pine trees as one gets closer to the city.

Most of the highway's stretch encompasses the municipality of Tuba in the province of Benguet.
The small settlements along the road, known as Camps 1 to 8, were originally established for the pioneer builders of the road, but have been occupied since by local residents. The Bued River flows along a rocky canyon from the lofty heights, and following this course the road was cut above the river bed.

The steepest portion of the road between Camp 6 and Camp 7 in Baguio is commonly known as "Zigzag Road" because of the numerous switchbacks required.  The design of the road switchbacks along that section of the road are similar in construction to the agricultural rice terraces found locally in Benguet and the other mountain provinces of the Cordillera Administrative Region.

History

As the Americans wanted to make Baguio a summer retreat to solidify Manila’s position, they decided to build a sturdy and reliable road to go there. They first tapped Charles W. Mead, who was a civil engineer. But was subsequently replaced by Colonel N.M. Holmes. Two years after in 1903, the project was turned over to the administration of Lyman Kennon.

The construction of the road commenced in 1903 by cutting across the mountains of Benguet with the combined efforts of various Filipinos, Americans, Chinese Filipinos and Japanese nationals. It was considered one of the most difficult and expensive civil engineering projects of its day, with expenditures by the newly established Insular Government of the Philippine Islands in excess of US$2.7 million. The Americans were inimical and irked, as evident in their stance that it was the "Christian Feast Holidays" celebrated by the Filipinos that caused the delays in the completion of the road. 

More than 2,300 foreign and local workers worked on the road. Aside from Filipino engineers and construction workers and U.S. Army Corps of Engineers headed by Col. Lyman Kennon, foreigners from 36 countries were recruited to work on the road; the majority, at about 1,500 or 22%, were Japanese.  The road proved to be a more challenging and dangerous than the original plan of Mead. Hundreds of workers died from malaria and dysentery while more plunged to their deaths while building the road. They are also affected when intense rainpour dredged their positions. The eventual result was in reality, a deviation from the original plan. After the road was completed, some of the foreign road workers, such as those from British Hong Kong and Japan, decided to remain in Baguio to live permanently, such as some Cantonese Chinese Filipinos or in the case of some Japanese Filipinos, move to work in Abaca plantations in Mintal or Calinan in Davao City.

The original road was a Macadam Telford-type road which was later improved into an all-weather asphalt roadway. More recently, some portions of Kennon Road have been replaced with concrete pavement.

The highway was severely damaged by the 1990 Luzon earthquake that the Department of Public Works and Highways decided for the permanent closure of the road. The highway was proposed to be replaced by a road traversing through the town of Itogon on the way to the lowlands of San Manuel, but was met with criticism from the inhabitants of Baguio. Kennon Road was reopened for public use on September 1, 1991, after rehabilitation efforts were completed. Throughout the years, however, the road has been subjected to temporary closures due to landslides that occurred during heavy storms or earthquakes. The road is currently being repaired and maintained by the Department of Public Works and Highways (DPWH) with usage limited only to light vehicles and only to residents living around the area. The rehabilitation and improvement of Kennon Road is currently being considered to be put under the Public-Private Partnership (PPP) scheme with the DPWH starting consultations with an international firm for a pre-feasibility study regarding the project.

In December 2021, Republic Act No. 11604 was signed into law which mandates the Department of Public Works and Highways to undertake the full rehabilitation and maintenance of Kennon Road.

Road hazards

Kennon Road is one of the most hazardous roads in the Philippines, especially during rainy seasons, when road accidents are common. The road is closed during heavy rains or typhoon conditions to avoid casualties from landslides

Portions of the highway are also prone to land-sinking, particularly along Barangay Camp 3 in Tuba.

Although Kennon is the shortest of the four major access roads, travel time is frequently as long as the other two because of poor road conditions. It usually takes an experienced commuter from 45 minutes to an hour to negotiate the  steep and winding climb by car.

Seasoned locals, race car drivers and motorsports enthusiasts, due to better road conditions, are now completing the drive under 30 to 25 minutes.

Intersections

Notes

References

External links
City of Pines.com - Kennon Road
GoBaguio.com - Kennon Road and Baguio

Roads in Benguet
Roads in La Union
Baguio